Avaza District is a city borough of Türkmenbaşy in Balkan Region in Turkmenistan, on the Krasnovodsk Gulf of the Caspian Sea.

References 

Populated places in Balkan Region